Phyllonorycter oreas is a moth of the family Gracillariidae. It is known from the Nepal.

The wingspan is 6-6.5 mm.

The larvae feed on Lannea and Odina species. They mine the leaves of their host plant. The mine has the form of a very large, irregularly oblong, tentiformed blotch occurring upon the upper surface of the leaf, usually situated on the space between two lateral veins. The upper epidermis of the leaf on the mining part is brownish-white in colour, with one or two strong, longitudinal ridges in fully matured state.

References

oreas
Moths of Asia
Moths described in 1973